The 1983 La Flèche Wallonne was the 47th edition of La Flèche Wallonne cycle race and was held on 14 April 1983. The race started in Charleroi and finished in Huy. The race was won by Bernard Hinault of the Renault team.

General classification

References

1983 in road cycling
1983
1983 in Belgian sport
1983 Super Prestige Pernod